Zachary Woolfe is an American music critic who specializes in classical music. Since 2022 he has been chief classical music critic for The New York Times.

Education and career 
Woolfe studied at Princeton University. Although he "had written a little bit for newspapers in college", he had not anticipated a career in journalism. In 2008, however, a friend at The New York Observer asked Woolfe to assist in coverage of the 2008 US Open tennis tournament. After additional writing for the paper, Woolfe was offered a regular column in 2009, devoted to opera.

In 2011 Woolfe started working as a freelance music critic for The New York Times, reporting on opera festivals in the US and internationally. In 2015 he became classical music editor, before being appointed as chief classical music critic in 2022.

Selected articles

References

External links
 Articles by Zachary Woolfe in The New York Times
 Articles by Zachary Woolfe in The Observer 
 
 

Living people
Princeton University alumni
American music critics
Opera critics
Critics employed by The New York Times
Classical music critics
Year of birth missing (living people)
21st-century American journalists
21st-century American male writers
American male journalists